This is a listing of first, second, and third-place finishers, winning time and the number of starters in the King George VI and Queen Elizabeth Stakes, a Group 1 British thoroughbred race run at 1-1/2 miles on turf for horses three years old and older. It is the most prestigious all-aged race run in the United Kingdom.

References 

Ascot Racecourse
King George VI and Queen Elizabeth Stakes
Lists of horse racing results